Dullabcherra railway station is a railway station in Karimganj district, Assam. Its code is DLCR. It serves Dullabcherra town. The station consists of a single platform.

Major trains 

 Dullavcherra–Badarpur Passenger
 Dullavcherra–Silchar Fast Passenger

References

Railway stations in Karimganj district
Lumding railway division